Caroline's Spine is the eponymous debut album of the American hard rock band of the same name. It was released in 1993 before the band was entirely formed. The lead singer/primary song writer Jimmy Newquist wrote all the songs and played most of the instruments for the recording. Many of the tracks on this album were later re-recorded with the full band for future Caroline's Spine albums.

Track listing
"Why Don't We Get Along"
"Psycho (Surf)"
"Ouch"
"Artichoke (VII)"
"As I Am"
"Say it to You"
"I Will Be Alright"
"I Like Everything"
"Train Called Sleep"
"Monsoon"
"Last Goodbye"
"Will You Hold My Hand"
"Psycho (Radio)"

Personnel
Produced by Dan Calderone & Caroline's Spine
All words and music by James P. Newquist
Music published by Archaic Music (BMI)
Engineered by Dan Calderone & Joe Statt
Recorded and mixed at Anza Digital Studios, San Diego, CA
Mastered by David Merullo, RJR Digital
Layout & design by Rick Goldman, CDS Graphics
Cover art by HPN II

References

1993 debut albums
Caroline's Spine albums